Świętno is a village in the administrative district of Gmina Wolsztyn, within Wolsztyn County, Greater Poland Voivodeship, in west-central Poland. The village was home to the Free State of Schwenten for seven months in 1919.

References

Villages in Wolsztyn County